Dipika Rukshana Chanmugam-Appleton (born 9 March 1972) is a Sri Lankan former swimmer. She competed in three events at the 1988 Summer Olympics. She was the first woman to represent Sri Lanka at the Olympics.

Early life
She is the daughter of Neil Chanmugam and granddaughter of Fredrick de Saram.

References

External links
 

1972 births
Living people
Sri Lankan female swimmers
Sri Lankan female freestyle swimmers
Olympic swimmers of Sri Lanka
Swimmers at the 1988 Summer Olympics
Place of birth missing (living people)
South Asian Games gold medalists for Sri Lanka
South Asian Games medalists in swimming